Aime Wichtendahl is the first transgender woman to be elected to Iowa's government as a chair on Hiawatha's City Council. She was elected to one of three seats on Hiawatha's City Council in 2015 and was re-elected for a second term in 2019.  She belongs to the Democratic Party.

Personal life 
Aime Wichtendahl was born in Minnesota in 1980. She then moved to Newhall, Iowa. She attended Kirkwood Community College and Mount Mercy College (now University) in Cedar Rapids where she graduated with a B.A. in journalism and political science in 2005. In the same year, Wichtendahl began her transition at the age of twenty-five. She moved to Hiawatha, Iowa in 2007 where she lives today with her son, Steven.

Political life 
Aime Wichtendahl was nominated for Hiawatha City Council in 2015.  Her campaign slogan that year was "Stand with Local Businesses," as she focused on further developing local businesses in the community. Out of five candidates, Winchtendahl, Dick Olson, and Dennis Norton won the City Council election in 2015. Wichtendahl made history by becoming the first transgender woman elected to Iowa's government. She ran for a second term in 2019 and will hold her position until 2023. She is an advocate for transgender and LGBTQIA+ rights, green energy, and small businesses.

References 

1980 births
Transgender women
Women city councillors in Iowa
Iowa city council members
Living people
Mount Mercy University alumni
Democratic Party (United States) politicians